Wusha may refer to:

Wusha, Anhui, town in Chizhou, Anhui, China
Wusha, Guizhou, town in Xingyi, Guizhou, China
Sheep Without a Shepherd, 2019 Chinese film
Wusha hat, Ming dynasty headgear

See also
Wu Sha (born 1985), Chinese pole vaulter